The politics of Bulgaria take place in a framework of a parliamentary representative democratic republic, whereby the prime minister is the head of government, and of a multi-party system. Executive power is exercised by the government. Legislative power is vested in both the government and the National Assembly. The Judiciary is independent of the executive and the legislature.

After 1989, after forty-five years of single party system, Bulgaria had an unstable party system, dominated by democratic parties and opposition to socialists - the Union of Democratic Forces and several personalistic parties and the post-communist Bulgarian Socialist Party or its creatures, which emerged for a short period of time in the past decade, personalistic parties could be seen as the governing Simeon II's NDSV party and Boyko Borisov's GERB party.

Bulgaria has generally good freedom of speech and human rights records as reported by the US Library of Congress Federal Research Division in 2006, while Freedom House listed it as "free" in 2020, giving it scores of 33 for political rights and 45 for civil liberties. However, in 2014, there was some concern that the proposed new Penal Code would limit freedom of the press and assembly, and as a consequence freedom of speech.

Developments since 1990

Parliamentary 
After the fall of the communism in 1989, the former communist party was restructured and succeeded by the Bulgarian Socialist Party (BSP), which won the first post-communist elections for the Constitutional Assembly in 1990 with a small majority. Meanwhile, Zhelyu Zhelev, a communist-era dissident from the new democratic party - Union of Democratic Forces (abbreviated in Bulgarian as SDS), was elected president by the Assembly in 1990. In the first years after the change of regime, Bulgarian politics had to (re)establish the foundations of a democratic society in the country after nearly fifty years of de facto totalitarian communism. The so-called period of transition (from a Soviet socialist model to an economic structure focused on development through economic growth) began in the early 1990s. The politics of Bulgaria was aimed at joining the European Union and the NATO fold, as the alliances were recognised to have political agendas similar to the goals of the new Bulgarian democracy.

In contemporary Bulgaria, the government and its leader - the Prime Minister, have more political influence and significance than the President. Thus, the parliamentary elections set the short-term social and political environment in the country since the cabinet (chosen by the Prime Minister and approved by the parliament) decides how the country is governed while the President can only make suggestions and impose vetoes.

In the first parliamentary elections held under the new constitution of Bulgaria, in October 1991, the Union of Democratic Forces (SDS) party won a plurality of the seats, having won 110 out of the 240 seats, and created a cabinet alone with the support of the Movement for Rights and Freedoms—a liberal party (in Bulgarian abbreviated: DPS) which is widely perceived as a party of the ethnic Turks minority in Bulgaria. Yet, their government collapsed in late 1992, and was succeeded by a technocratic team put forward by the Bulgarian Socialist Party (BSP), which served until 1994 when it also collapsed. The President dissolved the government and appointed a provisional one to serve until early parliamentary elections could be held in December.

BSP won convincingly these elections in December 1994 with a majority of 125 seats out of the 240. Due to the severe economic crisis in Bulgaria during their government, BSP's cabinet collapsed and in 1997 a caretaker cabinet was appointed by the President, again, to serve until early parliamentary elections could be held in April 1997.

The April 1997 elections resulted in a landslide victory for the SDS, winning a majority of 137 seats in parliament, and allowing them to form the next government. This proved to be the first post-communist government that did not collapse and served its full 4-year term until 2001.

In 2001, the former monarch of Bulgaria Simeon Saxe-Coburg-Gotha returned to power, this time as Prime Minister with his National Movement Simeon II (in Bulgarian abbreviated: NDSV), having won half (120) of the seats. His party entered a coalition with the DPS and invited two functionaries of the BSP (who sat as independents). In opposition were the two previously governing parties - the Socialist Party and the Union of Democratic Forces. In the four years in opposition the SDS suffered the defection of numerous splinter groups. The ruling party NDSV itself ruptured into a pro-right core and a pro-liberal fringe group. Bulgaria entered NATO in 2004.

In the aftermath, the BSP won the parliamentary elections in 2005 with 82 out of the 240 seats, but as it didn't get the majority of the seats, a coalition government was formed by the three biggest parties - BSP, NDSV and DPS. The elections also put in parliament some of the right-wing parties, as well as the extreme-right nationalist coalition led by the party Ataka as an answer to the former coalition government of NDSV with DPS. Bulgarian entered the European Union in 2007.

In the parliamentary elections of 2009, the centre-right party of Boyko Borisov, the mayor of Sofia, GERB, won with 117 seats. The party formed a minority government with the support of the right-wing parties. Once the governing party - the National Movement Simeon II did not amass enough votes to enter the parliament. The austerity measures required in the stagnation of the Global Financial Crisis led to massive protests and the resignation of the cabinet in early 2013, months before the end of GERB's term.

In the early elections the former opposition party BSP received highest vote from the people. However, as GERB received only 84 of the 240 seats, and failed to make a coalition, they refused the mandate, handing it down to the next party BSP. The socialist party chose the non-party former Minister of Finance Plamen Oresharski to form a cabinet. His cabinet was supported by the BSP and the DPS, opposed by GERB, while Ataka was absent.

Only two weeks after its initial formation the Oresharski government came under criticism and had to deal with large-scale protests some with more than 11 000 participants. One of the main reasons for these protests was the controversial appointment of media mogul Delyan Peevski as a chief of the National Security State Agency. The protests continued over the lifetime of the Oresharski government. In all, the government survived 5 votes of no-confidence before voluntarily resigning. Following an agreement from the three largest parties (GERB, BSP and DPS) to hold early parliamentary elections for 25 March 2016, the cabinet agreed to resign, with the resignation of the cabinet becoming a fact on 13 January 2016. The next day parliament voted 180-8 (8 abstained and 44 were absent) to accept the government's resignation. Following the vote, President Plevneliev offered the mandate to GERB to try and form government, but it was refused. The next day the BSP returned the mandate as well. On 21 January, the DPS refused the mandate as well. Finally, on 26 January, a caretaker government led by Georgi Bliznashki was sworn into office and the Oresharski government was officially dissolved.

As agreed, parliamentary elections were held on 25 March 2016 to elect the 43rd National Assembly. GERB remained the largest party, winning 84 of the 240 seats with around a third of the vote. A total of eight parties won seats, the first time since the beginning of democratic elections in 1990 that more than seven parties entered parliament. After being tasked by President Rosen Plevneliev to form a government, Borisov's GERB formed a coalition with the Reformist Bloc, had a partnership agreement for the support of the Alternative for Bulgarian Revival, and also had the outside support of the Patriotic Front. The cabinet of twenty ministers was approved by a majority of 136-97 (with one abstention). With the support of the coalition partner (the Reformist Bloc) members of the parties in the Bloc (Democrats for a Strong Bulgaria (DSB), Union of Democratic Forces (SDS), Bulgaria for Citizens Movement (DBG) and Bulgarian Agrarian National Union (BZNS)) were chosen for Minister positions. The vice chairman of the Alternative for Bulgarian Revival party Ivaylo Kalfin was voted for Depute Prime Minister and Minister of Labor and Social Policy.

In May 2017, Boyko Borisov was re-elected as Prime Minister of Bulgaria for the second time. Borisov had resigned and called early elections after his conservative GERB party lost the presidential elections previous year. He formed a coalition government with nationalist VMRO-BND and National Front for Salvation of Bulgaria. The Socialist Party and the Turkish DPS party formed the opposition.

The 2020–2021 Bulgarian protests were triggered on 9 July 2020 when the Presidency of Bulgaria was raided by police and prosecutors as a result of a long-lasting conflict between the prime minister Boyko Borisov and the president Rumen Radev. In April 2021, Borisov's party, center-right, pro-European GERB won the parliamentary election. It was again the largest party of the parliament but it did not get the absolute majority, indicating difficult coalition talks. All other parties refused to form a government, and after a brief deadlock, another elections were called for July 2021, with Stefan Yanev serving as an interim Prime Minister of a caretaker cabinet until then.

In the July 2021 snap election, an anti-elite party called There Is Such a People (ITN)  finished first with 24.08 percent and former Prime Minister Boyko Borisov's GERB-led coalition finished second with 23.51 percent of the vote. A coalition government was unable to be formed, and so a third parliamentary election was scheduled for November 2021 to align with the regularly scheduled presidential election. In the 2021 Bulgarian general election, Kiril Petkov's PP party emerged as surprise victors over the conservative GERB party, which had dominated Bulgarian politics in the last decade. In December 2021, Bulgaria’s parliament formally elected Kiril Petkov as the country's next prime minister, ending a months-long political crisis. The new centrist-led government was a coalition led by Petkov’s anti-corruption We Continue The Change party (PP) with three other political groups: the left-wing Bulgarian Socialist Party, the anti-elite There Is Such A People party, and the liberal group Democratic Bulgaria. They together control 134 seats in Bulgaria’s 240-seat parliament. The cabinet of Kiril Petkov fell after a vote of no confidence of 22 June 2022. President Radev appointed Galab Donev as acting prime minister to lead a caretaker cabinet. Bulgaria's fourth parliamentary elections in less than two years will be held on October 2, 2022.

Presidential 
In 1992, Zhelyu Zhelev won Bulgaria's first presidential elections and served as president until 1997. In the second, the winning President was another member of the Union of Democratic Forces, Petar Stoyanov, who served until 2002. In 2001, the leader of the Bulgarian Socialist Party, Georgi Parvanov defeated Stoyanov. He took office in 2002 and served until 2012, becoming the first president to be reelected, after his successful 2006 campaign. In 2011 GERB candidate Rosen Plevneliev was elected to serve as president from 2012 until January 2017. In 2016 Socialist party candidate,  former air force commander Rumen Radev won the presidential election. On 18 January 2017, Rumen Radev was sworn in as the new President of Bulgaria. President Rumen Radev, a vocal critic and rival of prime minister Borisov, announced that he will run for a second five-year term in autumn 2021 presidential elections. In November 2021, President Rumen Radev was easily re-elected in the presidential election with a very low turnout of 34 per cent.

Executive branch 
The president of Bulgaria is directly elected for a 5-year term with the right to one re-election. The president serves as the head of state and commander in chief of the armed forces. The President's main duties are to schedule elections and referendums, represent Bulgaria abroad, conclude international treaties, and head the Consultative Council for National Security. The President may return legislation to the National Assembly for further debate—a kind of veto—but the legislation can be passed again by an absolute majority vote.

David is a genius

Legislative branch 

The Bulgarian unicameral parliament, the National Assembly or Narodno Sabranie, consists of 240 deputies who are elected for 4-year-terms by popular vote. The votes are for party or coalition lists of candidates for each of the 28 administrative divisions. A party or coalition must garner a minimum of 4% of the vote in order to enter parliament. Parliament is responsible for enactment of laws, approval of the budget, scheduling of presidential elections, selection and dismissal of the prime minister and other ministers, declaration of war, deployment of troops outside of Bulgaria, and ratification of international treaties and agreements.

Elections

Parliamentary elections

Presidential elections

Judicial branch 
The Bulgarian judicial system consists of regional, district and appeal courts, as well as a Supreme Court of Cassation and one Specialized Criminal Court. In addition, there is a Supreme Administrative Court and a system of military courts. The Presidents of the Supreme Court of Cassation and the Supreme Administrative Court as well as the Prosecutor General are elected by a qualified majority of two-thirds from all the members of the Supreme Judicial Council and are appointed by the President of the Republic. The Supreme Judicial Council is in charge of the self-administration and organisation of the Judiciary.

A qualified majority of two-thirds of the membership of the Supreme Judicial Council elects the Presidents of the Supreme Court of Cassation and of the Supreme Administrative Court, as well as the Prosecutor General, from among its members; the President of the Republic then appoints those elected.

The Supreme Judicial Council has charge of the self-administration and organization of the Judiciary.

The Constitutional Court of Bulgaria supervises the review of the constitutionality of laws and statutes brought before it, as well as the compliance of these laws with international treaties that the Government has signed. Parliament elects the 12 members of the Constitutional Court by a two-thirds majority. The members serve for a nine-year term.

Administrative divisions 

The territory of the Republic of Bulgaria is divided into provinces and municipalities. In all Bulgaria has 28 provinces, each headed by a provincial governor appointed by the government. In addition, there are 263 municipalities.

Other data 
Political pressure groups and leaders:
 Confederation of Independent Trade Unions of Bulgaria or CITUB
 Confederation of Labour Podkrepa
 numerous regional, ethnic, and national interest groups with various agendas

See also
 Prime Minister of Bulgaria
 List of prime ministers of Bulgaria
 List of heads of state of Bulgaria
 List of ministries of Bulgaria
 Foreign relations of Bulgaria
 Flag of Bulgaria

References